The 1987 Arkansas Razorbacks baseball team represented the University of Arkansas in the 1987 NCAA Division I baseball season. The Razorbacks were coached by Norm DeBriyn, in his 18th season with the Razorbacks, and played their home games at George Cole Field.

Schedule and results

References

Arkansas
Arkansas Razorbacks baseball seasons
Arkansas Razorbacks baseball
College World Series seasons